Jean-Benoît Chouzy, M.E.P. (1837–1899) (Chinese: 司立修) was a Roman Catholic prelate who served as Prefect of Kuamsi (1891–1899) and Titular Bishop of Petnelissus (1891–1899).

Biography
Jean-Benoît Chouzy was born in on 5 March 1837 in Panissières, France, and ordained a priest in the La Société des Missions Etrangères in 1859.
On 21 August 1891, he was appointed during the papacy of Pope Leo XIII as Titular Bishop of Petnelissus and Prefect of Kuamsi.
On 22 November 1891, he was consecrated bishop in Hong Kong by Augustin Chausse, Titular Bishop of Capsus, with Giovanni Timoleone Raimondi, Titular Bishop of Achantus and Salvador Masot y Gómez, Titular Bishop of Hauara, serving as co-consecrators. 
He served as Prefect of Kuamsi until his death on 22 September 1899.

References

External links
 (for Chronology of Bishops)
 (for Chronology of Bishops)

19th-century Roman Catholic bishops in China
Bishops appointed by Pope Leo XIII
1837 births
1899 deaths
Paris Foreign Missions Society bishops
19th-century French Roman Catholic priests